Edward Richard Montagu, Viscount Hinchingbrooke (7 July 1692 – 3 October 1722) was a British Army officer and politician who sat in the House of Commons from 1713 to 1722.

Hinchingbrooke was the eldest son of Edward Montagu, 3rd Earl of Sandwich and his wife Elizabeth, daughter of the Earl of Rochester. His mother kept his father, who was generally believed to be insane, much confined, leaving Hinchingbrooke to carry out the public business of his family.

On 12 April 1707, at the age of 14, Hinchingbrooke married Elizabeth Popham (died 20 March 1761), the daughter of Alexander Popham of Littlecote, Wiltshire (a grandson of Colonel Alexander Popham). After a tour of the continent in 1708, he was given command of a troop in Sir Richard Temple's Regiment of Horse for the 1709 campaign in Flanders. During this time, Hinchingbrooke was one of the infamous Mohocks, and was arrested for assaulting a watchman in 1712.

In 1713, Hinchingbrooke was elected as Member of Parliament for Huntingdon, for which he served until 1722. He was commissioned captain of the grenadier company of the 2nd Regiment of Foot Guards on 11 June 1715, and appointed an aide-de-camp to the King on 22 December.

Hinchingbrooke became colonel of the 37th Regiment of Foot in 1717. In March 1722, he was named Lord Lieutenant of Huntingdonshire and in April was returned as MP for Huntingdonshire. However, he died in October 1722, predeceasing his father. He left five children:
 Hon. Mary Montagu
 Hon. Elizabeth Montagu, married first in September 1737 Kelland Courtenay, married second William 'Gentleman' Smith
 Hon. Edward Montagu
 John Montagu, 4th Earl of Sandwich (1718–1792)
 Capt. Hon. William Montagu (c. 1720–1757)
His widow later married Francis Seymour.

References

1692 births
1722 deaths
Edward Montagu, Viscount Hinchingbrooke
37th Regiment of Foot officers
British courtesy viscounts
Heirs apparent who never acceded
Lord-Lieutenants of Huntingdonshire
Members of the Parliament of Great Britain for English constituencies
British MPs 1713–1715
British MPs 1715–1722
Place of birth missing
Coldstream Guards officers